Iron(II) bromide is an inorganic compound with the chemical formula FeBr2. The anhydrous compound is a yellow or brownish-colored paramagnetic solid.  Several hydrates of FeBr2 are also known, all being pale colored solids.  It is a common precursor to other iron compounds in research laboratory, but no applications exist for this compound.

Structure
Like most metal halides, FeBr2 adopts a polymeric structure consisting of isolated metal centers cross-linked with halides. It crystallizes with the CdI2 structure, featuring close-packed layers of bromide ions, between which are located Fe(II) ions in octahedral holes. The packing of the halides is slightly different from that for FeCl2, which adopts the CdCl2 motif.  The tetrahydrates FeX2(H2O)4 (X = Cl, Br) have similar structures, with octahedral metal centers and mutually trans halides.

Synthesis and reactions
FeBr2 is synthesized using a methanol solution of concentrated hydrobromic acid and iron powder. It adds the methanol solvate [Fe(MeOH)6]Br2 together with hydrogen gas. Heating the methanol complex in a vacuum gives pure FeBr2.

FeBr2 reacts with two equivalents of tetraethylammonium bromide to give [(C2H5)4N]2FeBr4.  FeBr2 reacts with bromide and bromine to form the intensely colored, mixed-valence species [FeBr3Br9]−.

Magnetism
FeBr2 possesses a strong metamagnetism at 4.2 K and has long been studied as a prototypical metamagnetic compound.

References

Bromides
Iron(II) compounds
Metal halides